Butterfly wings or similar phrasings may refer to:
 Lepidoptera wings, literal sense
 butterfly effect, a proverbial illustration of the chaos-theory idea that small causes can have large effects
 Wings of a Butterfly Nebula, name for planetary nebula M2-9
 "Wings of a Butterfly", a 2005 song by HIM from the album Dark Light
 Butterfly Wings (film), a 1991 Spanish drama film
 "Butterfly Wings", a song by Machines of Loving Grace from Concentration
 "Butterfly Wings" or "Butterfly's Wings" names for Étude Op. 25, No. 9

See also
  Butterfly (disambiguation)
 "Bullet with Butterfly Wings", a 1995 song by The Smashing Pumpkins from the album Mellon Collie and the Infinite Sadness